Stavros Kouchtsoglou (1878-1949) was a Greek anarchist, active as a syndicalist in Greece and Egypt. He took part in the founding conference of General Confederation of Greek Workers and wrote articles in anarchist and syndicalist newspapers.

Biography 
He was born in Istanbul in 1878. From an early age he started working at the tobacco industry and later in Piraeus as a harbor worker. He traveled a lot and became an anarchist after getting in touch with many anarchist organizations and intellectuals of the time.

He participated in workers' struggles in Alexandria and Istanbul. In 1912, he wrote the pamphlet Κάτω η μάσκα (Down with the mask), as well as texts in Greek in the Italian anarchist newspaper Idea where he met and worked with Errico Malatesta.

After being exiled by the Egyptian authorities, he returned to Greece and got active in the tobacco workers' trade unions. In 1918, he participated in the founding conference of General Confederation of Greek Workers where, along with other anarcho-syndicalists such as Konstantinos Speras and Yannis Fanourakis, he defended the position that the confederation should be strictly syndicalist and not engage in political issues.

Afterwards, he settled in Volos where he wrote for the newspaper Άμυνα (Defense), differentiating his opinion from the rest of the newspaper regarding the 1920 Greek legislative election by publishing an article titled Δεν ψηφίζω (I don't vote) that supported abstention from the voting process. While in Volos, he contributed to the creation of a tobacco workers' trade union and continued promoting anarchist ideas.

He died in a nursing home in 1949.

References
 

1878 births
1949 deaths
Greek trade unionists
Greek anarchists
Constantinopolitan Greeks